Krystopher Nathaniel Barnes (born April 2, 1998) is an American football inside linebacker who is a free agent. He played college football at UCLA.

College career
Barnes played in 43 games with 31 starts recording 212 tackles (139 solo), 21 tackles for loss, five sacks, and two interceptions in four seasons. Barnes was All-Pac 12 honorable mention his senior season.

Professional career
On April 29, 2020, the Green Bay Packers signed Barnes to a three-year, $2.29 million contract as an undrafted free agent that includes a signing bonus of $7,000.

Throughout training camp, Barnes competed to be a starting inside linebacker against Oren Burks, Ty Summers, and fellow rookie Kamal Martin. On September 5, 2020, the Packers waived Barnes as part of their final roster cuts, but signed him to the practice squad the next day after clearing waivers. On September 12, 2020, the Green Bay Packers promoted Barnes to their active roster. Head coach Matt LaFleur elected to start Barnes at inside linebacker, alongside Christian Kirksey, to start the regular season.

He made his first career start and his professional debut in the Green Bay Packers’ season-opener at the Minnesota Vikings and recorded seven combined tackles (five solo) during their 43–34 victory. On October 18, 2020, Barnes recorded ten combined tackles (seven solo) during a 38–10 loss at the Tampa Bay Buccaneers in Week 6. In Week 7 against the Houston Texans, Barnes recorded his first career sack on Deshaun Watson during the 35–20 win. He was placed on the reserve/COVID-19 list by the team on November 6, 2020, and activated on December 2.
In Week 15 against the Carolina Panthers, Barnes forced a fumble on quarterback Teddy Bridgewater at the one yard line that was recovered by the Packers during the 24–16 win.

During the team's matchup against the Kansas City Chiefs in Week 9, Barnes made a season-high 9 tackles, including one that prevented a touchdown by running back Darrel Williams. He signed his tender offer from the Packers on April 18, 2022, to keep him with the team.

In the 2022 season-opener at Minnesota, he sustained ankle injury, which put him on injured reserve. On November 5, 2022, he was activated off of injured reserve.

NFL career statistics

Regular season

Postseason

References

External links
Green Bay Packers bio
UCLA Bruins bio

1998 births
Living people
American football linebackers
University of California, Los Angeles alumni
UCLA Bruins football players
Green Bay Packers players
Players of American football from Bakersfield, California